The Young Lawyers is an American legal drama that was aired on the ABC network for one season from September 21, 1970, until March 24, 1971. Starring Lee J. Cobb, Zalman King, Judy Pace and Phillip Clark, the show was a part of the network's 1970–71 lineup.

Plot
Aaron Silverman is part of a group of young, idealistic students at a top Boston law school who open a legal aid center, the "Neighborhood Law Office," to help the poor. As these young students have not yet been admitted to the bar, they receive guidance from established Boston lawyer David Barrett.

Cast
Lee J. Cobb as David Barrett
Zalman King as Aaron Silverman
Judy Pace as Pat Walters
Phillip Clark as Chris Blake

Episodes

Home media
On December 9, 2016, CBS DVD and Paramount Home Entertainment released the Complete Series on DVD in region 1. This is a Manufacture-on-Demand (MOD) release, available from online sellers such as Amazon.com and their CreateSpace MOD program.

Award nominations

References

External links
  
 

American Broadcasting Company original programming
1970 American television series debuts
1971 American television series endings
ABC Movie of the Week
Television series by CBS Studios
American legal drama television series
Television shows set in Boston